Sir George Ross Mathewson,  (born 14 May 1940) is a Scottish businessman. He is best known for transforming the Scottish bank The Royal Bank of Scotland from a struggling regional player into a quasi global bank with parallels to Citigroup or HSBC. He was described by the Sunday Herald, as "banking's answer to Bruce Springsteen".

He was the convener of Scotland's Council of Economic Advisers.

Early life and education
Mathewson was born in Dunfermline, the son of George Mathewson, an electrical engineer from Perth, and Charlotte Gordon Ross. He was educated at Perth Academy and the University of St Andrews' Queen's College in Dundee, from where he graduated in 1961 with a degree in mathematics and applied physics.

Career

Early career 
Mathewson started his career as a lecturer at St Andrews University where he did a PhD, before moving to United States to work for Bell Aerospace as an engineer in Buffalo, New York (1967–72). He was attracted back to Scotland by the opening up of the North Sea to oil exploration and joined venture capital group 3i, then called Industrial and Commercial Finance Corporation (1972–81). He was chief executive of the state-funded economic regeneration organisation the Scottish Development Agency (now called Scottish Enterprise) during the Margaret Thatcher years (1981–87). In this role Mathewson led initiatives including the creation of Silicon Glen – using state subsidies to help attract high-tech businesses to Scotland's central lowlands.

Royal Bank of Scotland (1987–2000) 
Mathewson joined the Royal Bank of Scotland, which is headquartered in the Scottish capital city of Edinburgh, in 1987 as director of strategic planning and development. The following year the Scottish bank showed signs of international ambition by acquiring the US-based Citizens Financial Group and by entering a long-term "strategic alliance" with the Spanish bank Banco Santander. While the first deal became the springboard for RBS gaining a significant US presence, the deal with Santander was dissolved in 2004 after the Spanish bank offended its UK partner by taking over its UK rival Abbey National.

When Mathewson became RBS's chief executive in 1992 the bank had been severely weakened by bad debts arising from poor lending decisions, which had been exacerbated by the economic slowdown of the early 1990s. To get the bank onto an even keel, Mathewson commissioned 'Project Columbus', which transformed the processes and structure of RBS's UK retail banking operations and included a tightening of credit controls, a focus on sales and a modernisation of processes and management. This earned him a reputation for ruthlessness (he was nicknamed 'Doctor Death') but gave the bank a solid platform for growth. In 1998 RBS became the first ever Scottish company to make profits of more than £1 billion. He was knighted for services to Scottish business the following year.

The defining moment of Mathewson's career came with the £20 billion takeover of the much larger UK bank National Westminster Bank in February 2000. The acquisition was a sweet triumph for Mathewson, who mustered support from investment banks Merrill Lynch and Goldman Sachs to defeat RBS's Scottish arch-rival the Bank of Scotland, which had opened the bidding for NatWest. Some argue that Mathewson would not have dared to make a hostile bid for NatWest if Sir Peter Burt, chief executive of the Bank of Scotland, had not gone first.

Soon after the NatWest acquisition, Mathewson stepped down as RBS's CEO, handing the reins to his deputy Fred Goodwin, who assumed responsibility for integrating NatWest. Mathewson became executive deputy chairman of the enlarged RBS Group. He became chairman in May 2001 following the retirement of former Tory politician George Younger.

While Mathewson was chairman, RBS bought Cleveland, Ohio-based Charter One, which was bolted onto the bank's Citizens arm, and a five per cent stake in Beijing-based Bank of China. Mathewson stepped down as chairman in April 2006, and was succeeded by former AstraZeneca chief executive Sir Tom McKillop, who is three years his junior. He became something of an iconic figure in Scottish business circles as a result of the transformation of RBS.

Life after RBS 
After retiring from RBS, Mathewson became chairman of the campaign board of the Royal Botanic Garden Edinburgh and non-executive chairman of hedge fund Tosca, which was active in RBS's disastrous takeover in 2007 of Dutch bank ABN Amro. He is also a non-executive director of investment company the Scottish Investment Trust, wealth managers Cheviot Asset Management and Perth-based bus and train company Stagecoach Group. He is on the board of directors of the Institute of International Finance and president of the International Monetary Conference.

Honours 
Mathewson was appointed a Commander of the Order of the British Empire (CBE) in the 1985 New Year Honours. He was knighted in the 1999 New Year Honours for services to economic development in Scotland and banking.

Personal life 
In 1966, Mathewson married Sheila Alexandra Graham Bennett, daughter of Eon Bennett, and has two sons. His interests include rugby, golf, tennis and water sports.

References

1940 births
Living people
People from Dunfermline
Scottish chief executives
Alumni of the University of St Andrews
NatWest Group people
Matthewson, George
Alumni of the University of Dundee
3i Group people
People educated at Perth Academy
Commanders of the Order of the British Empire
Knights Bachelor
Members of the Board of Directors of the Banco Santander